The Alarm is a studio EP by The Alarm. It was released in 1983 by IRS Records.

The EP was released initially on vinyl LP and cassette.

"For Freedom" was recorded live at The Marquee, Wardour Street, London W.1. on 30 January 1983

The cassette was released in the UK with the "68 Guns" single.

An extended re-mastered version was released, including extra tracks, in 2000.

Track listing
All songs written by Mike Peters & Eddie MacDonald, except "The Stand" (written by Sharp also) and "Across the Border" (written by Sharp).

"The Stand" — 3:41
"Across the Border" — 3:39
"Marching On" — 3:32
"Lie of the Land" — 2:31
"For Freedom [Live]" — 3:25

Single releases

"Marching On" and "The Stand" were both released before the EP.

Personnel
Acoustic Guitar — Dave Sharp, Mike Peters 
Backing Vocals — Dave Sharp, Eddie Macdonald, Twist 
Bass — Eddie Macdonald 
Drums — Twist 
Engineer — Jess Sutcliffe 
Harmonica — Mark Feltham, Mike Peters 
Keyboards — Angie Knox 
Mastered by [Remastered] — Mike Peters 
Mixed by — Kenny McAndrews, Steve Tannet  
Photography — Ed Colver 
Photography [Cover] — Harry T. Murlowski 
Producer — The Alarm, Aricentus, Harry T. Murlowski, Ian Wilson, Mick Glossop, Steve Tannet 
Recorded by — Kenny McAndrews, Steve Tannet 
Vocals — Dave Sharp, Mike Peters 
Written by — Sharp, Macdonald, Peters

Remastered release
Released in 2000, the remastered edition featured a revised track listings, b-sides and previously unreleased recordings, new and original artwork, unseen photos, lyrics, 
sleeve notes by Mike Peters and interactive programming information to play the EP in its original form.

Track listing:

"Unsafe Building"
"Up For Murder"
"Lie of the Land (demo)"
"Reason 41 (demo)"
"The Deceiver (demo)"
"What Kind of Hell (demo)"
"Sixty-Eight Guns (demo)"
"Marching On"
"Lie of the Land"
"Across the Border"
"The Stand"
"Blaze of Glory (long version)"
"Thoughts of a Young Man (Part One)"
"For Freedom (live)"
"Reason 41 (live)"
"The Deceiver (live)"
"Third Light (live)"
"Live of the Land (live)"
"Legal Matter (live)" (The Who cover)
"Marching On (live)"
"The Stand (long version)"
"Sixty-Eight Guns (single version)"

20th Anniversary Collectors' Edition
20th Anniversary Collectors Edition included an enhanced CD-ROM.

Also featured on CD-ROM: 
"The Stand" Video 
The Alarm's first ever interview on US TV featuring acoustic performances of Blaze Of Glory and Knocking On Heaven's Door. 
Original 1983 US TV advert for The Alarm EP plus lyrics & credits.

All tracks were remastered from the original master tapes.

Track Listing:

"The Stand" - 3:41
"Across the Border" - 3:39
"Marching On"- 3:32
"Lie of the Land" - 2:31
"For Freedom [Live]" - 3:25

References

1983 debut EPs
I.R.S. Records EPs
The Alarm albums
2000 compilation albums
I.R.S. Records compilation albums